Michael Stephenson  (born 27 January 1947) is an English rugby league commentator and former player.

Stephenson was born in Dewsbury, West Riding of Yorkshire. He is commonly known as "Stevo", the nickname that he is known by in rugby league and on TV, played at club level for Dewsbury, and Australian side Penrith, and also played for Yorkshire and Great Britain, with whom he won the 1972 Rugby League World Cup. Stephenson played in the  position for most of his playing career.

Stephenson was responsible for the setting-up of the Rugby League Heritage Centre at the George Hotel in Huddersfield.

He was appointed an MBE (Member of the Most Excellent order of the British Empire),  for his services to rugby league and sports broadcasting in the New Year Honours List 2017.

Playing career
Stephenson began his professional playing career at his hometown club Dewsbury in 1966, after being signed from local amateur club Shaw Cross RLFC. He went on to make his Great Britain debut in Castleford in 1971 against the touring New Zealand side. His greatest moment in international rugby league was being a member of Great Britain's victorious 1972 World Cup-winning side; Stevo scored a try against Australia in the World Cup Final.

Stephenson won caps for Great Britain while at Dewsbury in 1971 against New Zealand, in 1972 against France, and in the 1972 World Cup against France, New Zealand and Australia.

Stephenson's time in the Dewsbury first team coincided with an upturn in the club's fortunes on the pitch. He played in Dewsbury's 9–36 defeat by Leeds in the 1972–73 Yorkshire Cup Final and scored 2 tries in Dewsbury's 22-13 victory over Leeds in the 1972-73 Championship Final. He left Dewsbury after their championship winning season in 1973 to join Australian Rugby League outfit Penrith. He played 69 games for Penrith between 1974 and 1978, scoring 21 tries. Stevo was also player-coach of the side for a brief, unsuccessful spell. He ended his playing career in 1978 and settled in Sydney.

Broadcasting career
Stevo began his broadcasting career in Australia with brief spells at radio and television stations in Sydney. He first appeared on British airwaves in 1988, when he was invited to co-commentate on the rugby league Ashes series in Australia for BBC Radio 2 with Eddie Hemmings.

In 1990, Stevo joined the new British satellite television broadcaster BSB as a match summariser for its Rugby League coverage. At BSB, he joined up again with Hemmings, who had also been signed up by the broadcaster. The pairing were kept together when BSB and Sky Television merged to form BSkyB in 1991; the combined satellite TV network inherited BSB's rugby league TV contract.

Stephenson announced at the start of the 2016 season that he would be retiring from commentating at the end of the season after 26 years. His last game on the microphone was the 2016 Super League Grand Final.

Honours

Club
RFL Championship: 1972–73

International
World Cup: 1972

Individual
Harry Sunderland Trophy: 1973
Member of the Order of the British Empire (MBE): 2016

References

External links
!Great Britain Statistics at englandrl.co.uk (statistics currently missing due to not having appeared for both Great Britain, and England)
(archived by web.archive.org) Statistics at stats.rleague.com
Playing at Smales pace sank champions – article at yorkshirepost.co.uk
When Great Britain won the World Cup
Tracking down the heroes of 1972
Stevo: Looking Back, by Mike Stephenson  

1947 births
Living people
British sports broadcasters
Dewsbury Rams captains
Dewsbury Rams players
English rugby league coaches
English rugby league commentators
English rugby league players
Great Britain national rugby league team players
Members of the Order of the British Empire
Penrith Panthers coaches
Penrith Panthers captains
Penrith Panthers players
Rugby league hookers
Rugby league players from Dewsbury
Yorkshire rugby league team players